These are the official results of the Men's triple jump event at the 1994 European Championships in Helsinki, Finland. There were a total number of 20 participating athletes, with two qualifying groups and the final held on 13 August 1994. The top twelve and ties, and all those reaching 16.80 metres advanced to the final. The qualification round was held in Thursday August 11, 1994.

Medalists

Abbreviations
All results shown are in metres

Records

Qualification
Qualification standard: 16.85 metres or 12 best qualified for the final

Group A

Group B

Final

Participation
According to an unofficial count, 20 athletes from 13 countries participated in the event.

 (1)
 (1)
 (1)
 (1)
 (3)
 (1)
 (1)
 (1)
 (1)
 (1)
 (3)
 (2)
 (3)

See also
 1991 Men's World Championships Triple Jump (Tokyo)
 1992 Men's Olympic Triple Jump (Barcelona)
 1993 Men's World Championships Triple Jump (Stuttgart)
 1995 Men's World Championships Triple Jump (Gothenburg)
 1996 Men's Olympic Triple Jump (Atlanta)
 1997 Men's World Championships Triple Jump (Athens)

References

 Results

Triple jump
Triple jump at the European Athletics Championships